Cage Lake is a lake located north of Stillwater, New York. Fish present in the lake are brook trout. There is a trail leading to the lake from Buck Pond or Wolf Pond. No motors are allowed on Cage Lake.

References

Lakes of Herkimer County, New York